Yass Municipality was a Local Government Area of New South Wales from 1873 until 1980, when it was merged with Goodradigbee Shire to create Yass Shire.

References

Yass
Yass